Andy Maxwell is a former Irish rugby union player, previously of Ulster and Edinburgh Rugby. He joined the Ulster squad at the start of the 2003-04 season and made his Ulster debut against Edinburgh Rugby in September 2004 which he capped with a try.

Maxwell won his first Ireland A cap at the 2006 Churchill Cup tournament in the U.S. and Canada.  He won two caps with appearances against the USA and New Zealand Maori. He has also represented Ireland at Sevens, U21, U19 and U18 levels. His speed and style of rugby is well suited to the seven aside game and he took part in the Rugby World Cup Sevens tournament in Hong Kong in summer 2005. At the end of the 2006-07 season, Maxwell left Ulster and moved to Edinburgh Rugby.

In May 2008 Maxwell decided to pursue a career outside professional rugby and left Edinburgh Rugby. He and a number of other Irish professionals, such as Ross McCarron and Simon Hillary, did this.

Maxwell is now a co-owner of the Irish burrito bar chain Boojum.

References

External links
 Profile on Ulster Rugby
 2rugby
 Steinmetz and Maxwell into the breach for Ulster

1981 births
Living people
Ireland international rugby sevens players
Irish rugby union players
Rugby union players from Ballymena
Rugby union wings
Ulster Rugby players